Craig Koinzan (born c. 1948) is a former Canadian football player who played for the Calgary Stampeders and Edmonton Eskimos. He won the Grey Cup with Calgary in 1971. He played college football at Doane College in Crete, Nebraska.

References

1946 births
Living people
Calgary Stampeders players
Edmonton Elks players
People from Thayer County, Nebraska
Doane Tigers football players
Players of American football from Nebraska
American football defensive ends
Canadian football defensive linemen
American players of Canadian football